The Bani Shaiba Quraysh are an Arab tribe that hold the keys to the Kaaba.

Overview
The members of the tribe greet visitors into the Kaaba during the cleaning ceremony and clean the interior together with the visitors. Sheikh Abdul-Aziz Al-Sheibi (sometimes spelled Al-Shaibi), who died in November 2010, kept the key for eighteen years. His brother, Abdul Qader Al-Sheibi, became the new key-bearer. Abdul Qader Al-Sheibi died on 23 October 2014. Sheikh Abdul Qadir Al-Shaibi was the 108th successor of Uthman ibn Talha. Saleh Bin Taha Al-Shaibi, the oldest member of Shaibi family, is the new keeper of the keys to the Kaaba since then.

History 
The keys to the Kaaba was bestowed on Tasm, a tribe of ʿĀd before Quraysh. It passed to Khuza'a, then Qusai, who gave it to his son Abdul Dar, who handed it over to his son Othman. It shifted from one person to another until it rested with their nephew Shaiba. It is still inherited by their successors. Muhammad, the Islamic prophet, handed the keys to Bani Shaiba in the year of the conquest of Mecca, and said, "Take it, O Bani Talha, eternally up to the Day of Resurrection, and it will not be taken from you unless by an unjust, oppressive tyrant". A free standing arch stood where the houses of Banu Shaybah were located near the Kabah until it was removed circa 1950 CE to expand the Mataf area.

References

External links
 Article with a photo of the Kaaba key and lock at Arab News

Kaaba
Tribes of Arabia
Tribes of Saudi Arabia